Baghpat Road railway station is a small railway station in Baghpat district, Uttar Pradesh, India. Its code is BPM. It serves Baghpat city. The station consists of two platforms. The platforms are well sheltered. It lacks many facilities including water and sanitation.

Major trains 
Some of the important trains that runs from Baghpat Road are:

 Saharanpur–Farukhnagar Janta Express 
 Old Delhi–Haridwar Passenger 
 Delhi–Saharanpur Passenger 
 Shamli–Delhi Passenger

References

Railway stations in Baghpat district
Delhi railway division
Bagpat